The Women's Museum: An Institute for the Future was a museum located inside Fair Park in Dallas, Texas.  On October 5, 2011, the museum announced it would close on October 31, 2011, due to lack of funds.

Foundation of Women's Resources
This sparked an interest in the mother to collaborate with the women's resources to investigate the nature of women's participation in the development of Texas. This resulted in Texas Women's History Project and the museum exhibit, Texas Women - A Celebration of History, which toured throughout Texas in 1980 and 1981. This display is now on permanent display at Texas Woman's University.

See also

 List of Dallas Landmarks
 National Register of Historic Places listings in Dallas County, Texas

References

External links

2011 disestablishments in Texas
Defunct museums in Texas
History of women in Texas
Museums in Dallas
Women's museums in Texas